Rabaḍ refers to the suburbs of seventh- to eighth-century cities in Central Asia, including what is now the Turkistan Region in southern Kazakhstan, Iran, and Afghanistan.

This term, in the Andalusian Arabic form of ʼar-rabḍa, was borrowed into Spanish as arrabal/arrabalde.<ref name=Lipinski>{{cite book |last= Lipiński |first= Edward |author-link= Edward Lipiński (orientalist) |title= Semitic Languages: Outline of a Comparative Grammar |year= 1997 |pages= 131, 693 |publisher=Peeters Publishers |location= Leuven |series= Orientalia Lovaniensia Analecta |volume= 80 |isbn= 90-6831-939-6 |via=Tbilisi State University website |url= https://e-learning.tsu.ge/pluginfile.php/5865/mod_resource/content/0/Lipinski_-_Semitic_Languages._Outline_of_a_Comparative_Grammar.pdf |access-date=2 September 2022}} (At Google Books: 2nd edition (2001), .)</ref>

City layout
A typical qalʿat ("fortress") in Central Asia was based on a tripartite city model: citadel, shahristan (residential area inside the walls), and rabaḍ'' (suburb). This city model is valid not only for Central Asian city typology, but is also used to describe similar city types elsewhere in the Islamic world.

See also

Rabat (disambiguation), Arabic word for 'fortified town' or 'suburb'
Ribat, Arabic word for Early Muslim frontier fort, later caravansary and Sufi retreat
Robat (disambiguation), Persian variant for 'ribat'

References

Urban design
Central Asia